High Stakes Gambling is a Game Boy casino video game that takes place during the Great Depression in the 1930s.

Summary

An FBI agent named Pete Rosetti, who is going undercover as an inteprid gambler, must turn the Mafia from filthy rich to dirt poor in a series of gambling games in order to arrest them.

The initial rounds of the game involve blackjack, poker and slot machines; with the final confrontation being done on five-card draw poker. For a price, players can also buy special cheating tools in the hopes of making a profit off the gangsters who often use cheating methods of their own. In the first round of the game, the player needs to raise his bank account to a quarter of a million dollars in order to defeat five Mafia members.

When running low on cash, the gangsters panic and increase the intensity of their cheat to regain their cash from the player.

Reception
The independent video gaming magazine Allgame gave High Stakes Gambling an overall score of 3.5 stars out of a possible 5.

References

1992 video games
Casino video games
Electro Brain games
Game Boy-only games
North America-exclusive video games
Organized crime video games
Video games set in the 1930s
Multiplayer and single-player video games
Game Boy games
Video games about police officers
Video games developed in the United States